Waterworld is a 1995 American post-apocalyptic action film directed by Kevin Reynolds and co-written by Peter Rader and David Twohy. It was based on Rader's original 1986 screenplay and stars Kevin Costner, who also produced it with Charles Gordon and John Davis. It was distributed by Universal Pictures.

The setting of the film is in the distant future. The plot of the film centers on an otherwise nameless antihero, "The Mariner", a drifter who sails the Earth in his trimaran.

The most expensive film ever made at the time, Waterworld was released to mixed reviews from critics, who praised the futuristic setting and premise, but criticized the execution including the characterization and acting performances. The film also was unable to recoup its massive budget at the box office despite being one of the highest grossing films of 1995; however, the film did later become profitable owing to video and other post-cinema sales. The film was nominated for an Academy Award in the category Best Sound at the 68th Academy Awards.

The film's release was accompanied by a novelization, video game, and four themed attractions at Universal Studios Hollywood, Universal Studios Singapore, Universal Studios Japan, and Universal Studios Beijing called Waterworld: A Live Sea War Spectacular, all of which are still running .

Plot

The remains of human civilization live on rugged, floating communities known as atolls, having long forgotten about living on land. It is believed that a mythological "Dryland" exists somewhere in the endless ocean.

The Mariner, a lone drifter, arrives at an atoll on his trimaran to trade dirt, a rare commodity, for other supplies. When the atoll's residents see that the Mariner is a mutant, with gills and webbed feet, they decide to "recycle" him by drowning him in a pit of organic sludge. 

Suddenly, the atoll is attacked by the Smokers, a gang of pirates seeking a girl named Enola. According to their leader the Deacon, she has a map to Dryland tattooed on her back. Enola's guardian, Helen, attempts to escape with her on a gas balloon dirigible created by inventor Gregor, but the balloon is released erroneously. Helen quickly frees the Mariner, insisting he take both of them with him.

The three escape to the open sea aboard the trimaran, pursued by the Smokers. Helen's escape results in damage to the Mariner's boat, and he angrily refuses to take her to Dryland. He then cuts her hair and then Enola's as punishment but decides to take them anyway. 

During their quest to find Dryland, many other events happen to them, such as a drifter approaching them and being killed by the Mariner after a trade, coming across a trap by the Smokers, finding a large mutated shark, and discovering Enola's drawings of various Dryland objects that the Mariner recognizes from National Geographic magazines. 

Later, Helen explains that she believes humans once lived on land and demands to know where the Mariner collected his dirt. He provides her with a homemade diving bell to show her the underwater remains of Denver, Colorado and the soil on the ocean's floor, seeming to disprove Helen's belief. When they surface, they find that the Smokers have caught up to them, threatening to kill them if they do not hand over Enola, who is hiding aboard the boat. 

The Smokers abduct Enola and try to kill Helen and the Mariner. The Mariner takes Helen, diving underwater to avoid capture, with the Mariner's gills helping Helen breathe. When they resurface, they discover his boat has been destroyed. Gregor manages to find them and takes them to a new makeshift atoll inhabited by the survivors of the first attack using his gas balloon dirigible.

The Mariner takes a captured Smoker's jet ski to chase down the Deacon aboard the remains of the Exxon Valdez. The Deacon sends the crew to start rowing the "Deez" after bluffingly announcing that he has decoded the map on Enola's back. 

With all of the Smokers below deck to row the tanker, the Mariner confronts the Deacon, threatening to ignite the oil reserves below unless he returns Enola. The Deacon calls the Mariner's bluff, knowing that it would destroy the ship, but to his surprise, the Mariner drops a flare into the oil reservoir. 

The ship is engulfed in flames, and begins to sink. The Mariner rescues Enola, escaping via a rope from Gregor's balloon with Helen and the Atoll Enforcer aboard. As the Mariner climbs with Enola, the Deacon grabs the rope to escape the sinking ship. He is kicked off into the water but climbs aboard a jet ski. Firing upon the balloon shakes Enola into the ocean. As the Deacon and some of his men converge on Enola, the Mariner makes an impromptu bungee jump from the balloon to grab Enola right before the Deacon and his men collide on their jet-skis, dying in an explosion.

Sometime later, Gregor identifies Enola's back tattoo as coordinates with reversed directions. Following the map, Gregor, the Mariner, the Atoll Enforcer, Helen, and Enola discover Dryland, which is revealed to be the top of Mount Everest, covered with vegetation and wildlife. They also find a crude hut with the remains of Enola's parents. The Mariner, feeling that he does not belong on Dryland, builds a new wooden trimaran and departs, as Helen and Enola bid him farewell.

Cast

Production
Writer Peter Rader came up with the idea for Waterworld during a conversation with Brad Krevoy where they discussed creating a Mad Max rip-off. Rader wrote the initial script in 1986 but kept it shelved until 1989. Rader cited Mad Max as a direct inspiration for the film, while also citing various Old Testament stories and the story of Helen of Troy (with the main female character being named Helen in a direct reference). It is also widely believed that inspiration was taken from Freakwave by Peter Milligan and Brendan McCarthy, a "Mad Max goes surfing" comic strip first published by Pacific Comics in Vanguard Illustrated #1-3 (November 1983-March 1984), and continued by Eclipse Comics in Strange Days #1-3 (November 1984-April 1985). McCarthy himself had unsuccessfully tried to sell Freakwave as a movie in the early 1980s; he would go on to co-write Mad Max: Fury Road (2015).

After several rewrites, Kevin Costner and Kevin Reynolds joined the Waterworld production team in 1992. The film marked the fourth collaboration between Costner and Reynolds, who had previously worked together on Fandango (1985), Robin Hood: Prince of Thieves (1991), and Rapa-Nui (1994), the latter of which Costner co-produced but did not star in. Waterworld was co-written by David Twohy, who cited Mad Max 2: The Road Warrior as a major inspiration. Both films employed Dean Semler as director of photography.

During production, the film was plagued by a series of cost overruns and production setbacks. Universal initially authorized a budget of $100 million, which by mid-1994 had swollen to $135 million, with final costs reaching an estimated $175 million, a record sum for a film production at the time. Filming took place in a large artificial seawater enclosure similar to that used in the film Titanic two years later; it was located in the Pacific Ocean off the coast of Hawaii. The final scene was filmed in Waipio Valley on the Big Island, also referred to as The Valley of Kings. The production was hampered by the collapse of the multimillion-dollar set during a hurricane. Additional filming took place in Los Angeles, Huntington Beach, and Santa Catalina Island, and the Channel Islands of California. Before filming began, Steven Spielberg had warned Costner and Reynolds not to film on open water owing to his own production difficulties with Jaws.

The production featured different types of personal watercraft, especially Kawasaki jet skis. Kevin Costner was on the set for 157 days, working six days a week. At one point, he nearly died when he got caught in a squall while tied to the mast of his trimaran. Professional surfer Laird Hamilton was Kevin Costner's stunt double for many water scenes. Hamilton commuted to the set via jet ski.

Mark Isham's score, which was not recorded for approximately 25 percent of the film and had only demos completed, was reportedly rejected by Costner because it was "too ethnic and bleak", contrasting with the film's futuristic and adventurous tone; Isham offered to try again but was not given the chance. James Newton Howard was brought in to write the new score. Joss Whedon flew out to the set to do last minute script rewrites and later described it as "seven weeks of hell"; the work boiled down to editing in Costner's ideas without alteration.

The state of Hawaii had more than $35 million added to its economy as a result of the colossal film production. Despite their reported clashes, the director and star reunited almost two decades later for the History Channel miniseries Hatfields & McCoys.

Inspired by racing trimarans built by Jeanneau Advanced Technologies' multi-hull division, Lagoon, a custom  yacht was designed by Marc Van Peteghem and Vincent Lauriot-Prevost and built in France by Lagoon. Two versions were built, a relatively standard racing trimaran for distance shots, and an effects-laden transforming trimaran for closeup shots. The first trimaran was launched on 2 April 1994, and surpassed  in September of that year. The transforming version was first seen in the film as a sort of raft with a three-bladed egg-beater windmill. When needed, levers could be triggered that would flatten the windmill blades while raising a hidden mast to full racing height. A boom emerged, previously hidden in the hull, and the two sails were automatically unfurled. Once the transformation was complete, this version could actually sail, although not as well as the dedicated racer. The transforming version is in private hands in San Diego, California. For many years, the racing version was kept in a lake at Universal Studios Florida, before being restored for use as a racing trimaran named Loe Real, which was (as of 2012) being offered for sale in San Diego.

Kevin Reynolds quit the film before its release, owing to heated battles with Costner over his creative decisions. Reynolds still received full credit as director.

Reception

Box office
Because of the runaway costs of the production and its expensive price tag, some critics dubbed it "Fishtar" and "Kevin's Gate", alluding to the flops Ishtar and Heaven's Gate, although the film debuted at the box office at No. 1. For its first weekend, Waterworld collected a total of $21.6 million. With a budget of $172 million (and a total outlay of $235 million once marketing and distribution costs are factored in), the film grossed $88 million at the North American box office. The film did better overseas, with $176 million at the foreign box office, for a worldwide total of $264 million. However, even though this figure surpasses the total costs spent by the studio, it does not take into account the percentage of box office gross that theaters retain, which is generally up to half; but after factoring in home video sales and TV broadcast rights among other revenue streams, Waterworld eventually became profitable.

Critical response

Contemporary reviews for the film were mixed. Roger Ebert gave Waterworld 2.5 stars out of 4 and said: "The cost controversy aside, Waterworld is a decent futuristic action picture with some great sets, some intriguing ideas, and a few images that will stay with me. It could have been more, it could have been better, and it could have made me care about the characters. It's one of those marginal pictures you're not unhappy to have seen, but can't quite recommend." Owen Gleiberman gave it a B in Entertainment Weekly. He commented that while its massive budget had paid off by genuinely creating the sensation of a world built on water, the film generally came off as a second-rate rip-off of The Road Warrior, with weaker, slower-paced action sequences and less startling villains. He praised Costner's performance, but found the film's environmental message pretentious. James Berardinelli of Reelviews Movie Reviews was one of the film's few supporters, calling it "one of Hollywood's most lavish features to date". He wrote: "Although the storyline isn't all that invigorating, the action is, and that's what saves Waterworld. In the tradition of the old Westerns and Mel Gibson's Mad Max flicks, this film provides good escapist fun. Everyone behind the scenes did their part with aplomb, and the result is a feast for the eyes and ears." Mick LaSalle, reviewing the film the week of its release on home video, argued that it did not deserve some of its more negative reviews, since "despite its confused impulses and occasional slow spots, Waterworld... has an elusive, appealing spirit that holds up for more than two hours. It's a genuine vault at greatness that misses the mark -- but survives." He commented that while the film succeeds at its high ambitions for isolated moments, the clash between its earnest ambition and intrusive flashiness makes it generally fall short of its reach.

On Rotten Tomatoes the film holds an approval rating of 45% based on 64 reviews, with an average rating of 5.5/10. The site's critics consensus reads: "Though it suffered from toxic buzz at the time of its release, Waterworld is ultimately an ambitious misfire: an extravagant sci-fi flick with some decent moments and a lot of silly ones." Metacritic assigned the film a weighted average score of 56 out of 100, based on 17 critics, indicating "mixed or average reviews". Audiences polled by CinemaScore gave the film an average grade of "B" on an A+ to F scale.

In a 2020 retrospective, Ben Child of The Guardian described it as "a perfectly watchable sci-fi cult classic" that deserves reappraisal. He acknowledged that much of the plot was illogical and absurd and some of the action set-pieces "preposterously ambitious", but argued that both of them offer excitement and B-movie charm.

Cast reception
Kevin Costner said he's very fond of the film: "It stands up as a really exotic, cool movie. I mean, it was flawed — for sure. But, overall, it's a very inventive, cool movie. It's pretty robust." Dennis Hopper also enjoyed it, saying "I thought Waterworld got a bad name for itself in the United States, but it did really well in Europe and Asia. I think the studio sort of shot themselves in the foot by announcing it was so over budget, blah blah blah, it's going to be a failure... All this came out before we released it in the States. But I enjoyed it."

Accolades

Other media

Home media
Waterworld was released on VHS and LaserDisc on January 23, 1996. On September 9, 1997, it debuted on a THX certified widescreen VHS release. The film was then released on DVD on November 1, 1998, on Blu-ray on October 20, 2009, and on 4K Blu-ray on July 9, 2019.

Novelization
A novelization was written by Max Allan Collins and published by Arrow Books. It goes into greater detail regarding the world of the film.

Comic books
A sequel comic book four-issue mini-series entitled Waterworld: Children of Leviathan, drawn by Kevin Kobasic, was released by Acclaim Comics in 1997. Kevin Costner did not permit his likeness to be used for the comics, so the Mariner looks different. The story reveals some of the Mariner's back-story as he gathers clues about where he came from and why he is different. The comic expands on the possible cause of the melting of the polar ice caps and worldwide flood, and introduces a new villain, "Leviathan", who supplied the Deacon's Smoker organization. The comic hints at the possibility that the Mariner's mutation may not be caused by evolution but by genetic engineering and that his origins may be linked to those of the "Sea Eater", the sea monster seen during the fishing scene in the film.

Video games
Video games based on the film were released for the Super NES, Game Boy, Virtual Boy, and PC. There was to be a release for the Genesis, but it was canceled and was only available on the Sega Channel. A Sega Saturn version of the game was also planned, and development was completed, but like its Genesis counterpart it was cancelled prior to release. The Super NES and Game Boy releases were only available in the United Kingdom and Australia. While the Super NES and Virtual Boy versions were released by Ocean Software, the PC version was released by Interplay. The Virtual Boy version of the game was the only movie licensed game for the system.

Pinball
The film was released as a pinball machine in 1995 by Gottlieb Amusements (later Premier, both now defunct).

Theme park attractions

There are attractions at Universal Studios Hollywood, Universal Studios Japan, and Universal Studios Singapore based on the film. The show's plot takes place after the film, as Helen returns to the Atoll with proof of Dryland, only to find herself followed by the Deacon, who survived the events of the film. The Mariner arrives after him, defeats the Deacon and takes Helen back to Dryland.

TV series
In July 2021, it was announced Universal Cable Productions was in early development on a follow-up TV series to be directed by Dan Trachtenberg.

See also
 Future Boy Conan
 The Drowned World

Notes

References

Further reading
  359 pages

External links

 
 
 
 
 

1995 films
1990s action adventure films
1990s science fiction action films
American action adventure films
American science fiction action films
1990s English-language films
Fictional-language films
Films set in the 25th century
American post-apocalyptic films
Climate change films
Flood films
Seafaring films
Films shot in Hawaii
Davis Entertainment films
Universal Pictures films
Films directed by Kevin Reynolds
Films produced by John Davis
Films scored by James Newton Howard
Films set on boats
Films set on ships
Films with screenplays by David Twohy
Films with screenplays by Joss Whedon
Czech Lion Awards winners (films)
Fiction set on ocean planets
Sea adventure films
Films adapted into comics
1990s American films